Hamza is a letter in the Arabic alphabet, representing the glottal stop  although it is not one of the 28 "full" letters of Arabic.

Hamza and Ḥamza may refer to:

People
See also
 Hamza ibn Abdul-Muttalib, the paternal uncle of the Islamic prophet Muhammad
 Hamza ibn-'Ali ibn-Ahmad, a founding leader of the Druze sect
 Hamza Ali Al-Khateeb, Syrian child who died of torture and organ destruction while in Esad regime custody

Places
 Hamza, Iran, a village in Kerman Province, Iran
 Hamza, Iraq, (Al-Hamzah) a village in Qadisiyah Province, Iraq
 Hamza Stone, black colored antic rock at the Giresun Adası
 Tala Hamza, town in northern Algeria
 Hamza River, a very large aquifer, that roughly follows the course of the Amazon River, in Brazil
 Hamza (district), a city district of Tashkent, capital of Uzbekistan
 Hamza station, former name of Novza station on the Chilonzor Line of the Tashkent Metro.

Other uses
 Hamza (cicada), a genus of insects in the family Cicadidae
 Hamzanama, a 16th-century book
 Thymelicus hamza, a butterfly of the family Hesperiidae

See also
 Hamsa (disambiguation)